Vandrezzer Football Club is a professional football club in Lagos state, Nigeria, that competes in the Nigeria National League, the second tier of Nigerian Professional Football League.

Founded in 2019, the club joined the Nigerian National League and played at Agege Stadium since (formerly at Ikot Ikpene Township Stadium) its formation. Vandrezzer FC established itself as a major force in Nigeria with the introduction of pre-match activities, live match streaming and commentary, selling of regular and premium match day and seasonal tickets, the introduction of lounges and suite in the executive box sections, implementation of top-notch sound systems in the stadium and others, as they aim to redefine the dynamics of club football in Nigeria.

History 
After four years of sponsoring the Joe Udofia Cup, a grassroots football tournament played every year-end in Ibiono Ibom, Akwa Ibom State, Nigeria, Vandrezzer Energy Services Limited decided to set up a proper football club.

Consequently, the company purchased playing right for Vandrezzer FC in Nigeria club second-tier division, Nigeria National League (NNL) on  September 10, 2019, with the intent of advancing to the top flight – Nigeria Professional Football League (NPFL). On September 11, 2019, a day after the slot was bought, the club was successfully registered with the Corporate Affairs Commission (CAC), as a sports business outfit under the Vandrezzer Group of Companies.
The official unveiling of the club to the public, including the pioneer head coach Rafael Everton(Brazil) and his technical crew, the backroom staff, and all registered players for the inaugural season, took place on November 24, 2019, at St. Theresa Primary School, Use Abat, Ibiono-Ibom in Akwa Ibom State. The Lions made their NNL debut on November 30, 2019, in a 1–0 away defeat to J. Atete FC of Ughelli, Delta State.
The first league goal was scored by Ekerete Udom in the 65th minutes of the 2–0 home win against Bayelsa United.

In 2019, the leadership of Vandrezzer FC announced their plan to construct a 5,000 capacity stadium in Ibiono, a local government in Akwa-Ibom state. In January 2021, Vandrezzer relocated to Lagos.

On March 1 Vandrezzer F.C. media announced the resignation of the head coach Rafael Everton, his assistant Jose Israel and Alberico Da Silva, have all left the club

Vandrezzer FC became the first Nigerian football club with 1 million Facebook followers.

Honours
Lagos FA Cup: 1
2021

Stadium 
Vandrezzer F.C. play their home matches at the Teslim Balogun Stadium, Lagos

Squad

References

External links 
 Official Website

Vandrezzer FC quits NNL.

Nigeria National League outfit Vandrezzer FC have announced its decision to quit the Nigeria National League in the grounds of irregularities on the part of the league Management Company.

The move is not unconnected with the recent issues surrounding the decision to award Osun United maximum points despite evidence of misconduct by fans.

Also, the decision to fine Vandrezzer FC the sum of 100,000 naira after the team failed to honour the NNL clash in Omoku despite refusal on the part of Go Round FC not to allow Vandrezzer FC media officials entry into the stadium.
 Official Website

Nigeria National League
2019 establishments in Nigeria